These figures do not include trade intra ASEAN, services or foreign direct investment, but only trade in goods. The tenth largest ASEAN trading partners with their total trade (sum of imports and exports) in billions of US Dollars for calendar year 2021. In the table, a positive trade balance means that the ASEAN exports more than it imports from the given country.

See also 

 Economy of ASEAN
 List of the largest trading partners of China
 List of the largest trading partners of the United States
 List of the largest trading partners of the European Union
 List of the largest trading partners of Japan
 List of the largest trading partners of Germany

References

ASEAN